The Sean Salisbury Show is a television show hosted by Sean Salisbury. It airs on beIN Sports.

References

American sports television series